Horst Stottmeister (born 7 January 1948) is a retired German freestyle wrestler. He was a European champion in 1970 and 1975 and won three silver medals at the world championships in 1971–1975.
He placed fourth at the 1972 and 1976 Summer Olympics.

References

1948 births
Living people
Olympic wrestlers of East Germany
Wrestlers at the 1972 Summer Olympics
Wrestlers at the 1976 Summer Olympics
German male sport wrestlers
European Wrestling Championships medalists
World Wrestling Championships medalists
People from Stendal
Sportspeople from Saxony-Anhalt